The Place on a Grey Tricorne is a Kazakh film directed by Ermek Shinarbayev. It won the Golden Leopard at the 1993 Locarno International Film Festival.

Plot
Some days of the young man living in Almaty. Boozes, girlfriends, an idle talk, drugs – here the maintenance of his life. And, seemingly, it for a long time, if not forever. "I didn't manage to appeal to the Marble Admiral as he turned on heels, precisely the horse who became on racks before the Pole star and specified to me that place on the cocked hat where I will have to carry out the life..."

Reception
It won the Golden Leopard at the 1993 Locarno International Film Festival.

References

External links

Golden Leopard winners
Kazakhstani drama films
Films directed by Yermek Shinarbayev